IFC One Saigon, formerly named Saigon One Tower, is an under construction high-rise building located at 34A Ton Duc Thang Street, Ho Chi Minh City, Vietnam. The tower was invested by Saigon M&C and Dong A Bank, totals approximately $228 million USD. The building was designed to be a 41-storey tower with three functions. The tower's construction started in 2007 and was expected to be completed in 2012. Saigon M&C would have become one of the highest priced real estate developments in Vietnam and was expected to be the second tallest building in Ho Chi Minh City after Bitexco Financial Tower. However, construction works has halted since 2011 with the building 80% complete. In 2017, outstanding debts of the developer totaling over VND 7,000 billion were sold to the Vietnam Asset Management Company for VND 680 billion (US$ 29 million). After defaulting on the debts, the building was seized by the Vietnam Asset Management Company and put up for auction. The developers are on trial for falsifying documents which were used to secure the loans from Dong A Bank.

According to city construction department, the Saigon One Tower and other stalled or delayed projects in the city are a result of the 2008 financial crash.

In 2021, the tower was acquired by Viva Land and renamed IFC One Saigon, and is currently under construction as a mixed used development. The building will contain offices, residential and serviced apartments, and retail outlets.

See more
List of tallest buildings in Vietnam

References

External links

 Saigon One Tower website

Unfinished buildings and structures
Skyscrapers in Ho Chi Minh City
Skyscraper office buildings in Vietnam
Residential skyscrapers